Rio Hotel Ltd v New Brunswick (Liquor Licensing Board) [1987] 2 S.C.R. 59 is a leading Supreme Court of Canada decision on the Constitution's criminal law power. The Court held that, despite overlapping with valid federal law, the provincial law that restricted the amount of nudity in bars was constitutionally valid.

Background
The New Brunswick Liquor Control Act required that all liquor licences be accompanied by an entertainment licence that limited the degree of nudity allowed within the establishment. Rio Hotel decided to challenge the constitutionality of the law on the grounds that it related to public morality which is a matter of federal criminal law.

The issue before the Supreme Court was whether "a provincial prohibition of nude entertainment attached to a liquor licensing scheme operates notwithstanding the more general but related prohibitions contained in the Code". The unanimous Court held that it did.

Reasons of the court
Chief Justice Dickson, writing for McIntyre, Wilson, and Le Dain, held that the law was valid. Dickson characterized the law as regulating entertainment as a means to boost alcohol sales. Presumptively this matter is both of a local nature and relating to property and civil rights. Though there are provisions within the Criminal Code dealing with nudity, they do not conflict with the provincial law.

Furthermore, the law did not possess any penal consequences required for all valid criminal law.

See also
 List of Supreme Court of Canada cases (Dickson Court)

External links
 

Canadian federalism case law
Supreme Court of Canada cases
1987 in Canadian case law